Suffolk is a county in East Anglia. It is bounded by Norfolk to the north, Cambridgeshire to the west and Essex to the south. At the top level of local government is Suffolk County Council, and below it are five borough and district councils: Ipswich, East Suffolk, Mid Suffolk, Babergh and West Suffolk. Much of the coast consists of the estuaries of the Orwell, Stour, Alde, Deben and Blyth rivers, with large areas of wetlands and marshes.

Local nature reserves (LNRs) are designated by local authorities under the National Parks and Access to the Countryside Act 1949. The local authority must have a legal control over the site, by owning or leasing it or having an agreement with the owner. LNRs are sites which have a special local interest either biologically or geologically, and local authorities have a duty to care for them. They can apply local bye-laws to manage and protect LNRs.

 there are 36 LNRs in the county. Three are in Areas of Outstanding Natural Beauty, seven are Sites of Special Scientific Interest, one is a Nature Conservation Review site and two are managed by the Suffolk Wildlife Trust.

Key

Other classifications
DVAONB = Dedham Vale Area of Outstanding Natural Beauty
NCR = Nature Conservation Review
SCHAONB = Suffolk Coast and Heaths Area of Outstanding Natural Beauty
 SWT = Suffolk Wildlife Trust
 SSSI = Site of Special Scientific Interest

Sites

See also
List of Sites of Special Scientific Interest in Suffolk
National nature reserves in Suffolk

Notes

References

Suffolk
Suffolk